The Vaps Movement (later Eesti Vabadussõjalaste Liit, vabadussõjalased, or colloquially vapsid, a single member of this movement was called vaps) was an Estonian political organization. Founded in 1929, it emerged as a mass anti-communist and populist movement from the Union of Participants in the Estonian War of Independence, an association of veterans of the Estonian War of Independence (1918–1920). The leaders of this association were Andres Larka (formal figurehead and presidential candidate) and Artur Sirk.

The Vaps Movement was an anti-communist organisation led by former military officers, and most of its base were veterans of the 1918–1920 Estonian War of Independence. Early support for the movement came from campaigns to financially uplift Estonian veterans, and redistribute land previously held by the Baltic German nobility. The organisation advocated a more authoritarian and nationalist government in Estonia. The organisation welcomed Hitler's rise to power, even though they later tried to distance themselves from Nazism.  The league rejected racial ideology and openly criticized the Nazi persecution of Jews and lacked the willingness to use violence or adopt the goal of territorial expansion. They wore a black beret as their uniform headgear, and used  the Roman salute. Moderate members such as Johan Pitka gradually left the organisation. The organisation issued its own newspaper, Võitlus ('The Struggle').

The movement strongly supported constitutional reform that would enable a strong president to address national problems. Estonian patriots began advocating such a change in the mid 1920s. In October 1933 the government was forced to allow the Vaps movement to put forward its own referendum on constitutional reform, after watered down centre-right proposals failed to win support. This was approved by 72.7 percent of the voters. The organization was banned by the government of Jaan Tõnisson (who opposed the constitutional reform) under a state of emergency imposed before the referendum, but after this the organization was re-established and became more patriotic. The league spearheaded replacement of the parliamentary system with a presidential form of government and laid the groundwork for an April 1934 presidential election, which it expected to win.

After the League won absolute majorities in local elections in the three largest cities at the beginning of 1934, but not in the most rural self-governments nor small towns and boroughs, the recently elected constitutional "State Elder" (head of government and head of state) Konstantin Päts declared a state of emergency in the whole country on 12 March 1934 (in certain parts, this had been in effect since 1918). The Vaps Movement was disbanded and its leading figures were arrested in December 1935.

On 6 May 1936, 150 members of the league went on trial; 143 of them were convicted and sentenced to lengthy terms of imprisonment. They were granted an amnesty and freed in 1938, by which time the league had lost most of its popular support. By 1 January 1938, a new constitution took effect and new parliament was elected in February 1938. The new constitution combined a strong President with a partly elected and partly appointed, officially non-partisan, Parliament.

The movement maintained good relations with Finnish fascist movements such as the Lapua Movement, Patriotic People's Movement and Academic Karelia Society.

As of 2019, the Vaps movement had no known active members. In 2009, Jüri Liim reportedly submitted a formal application to restore the original Vaps Movement. The application was not successful, and the Vaps Movement has not been legalised in Estonia.

See also
Estonian War of Independence
History of Estonia
Lapua Movement

References

Andres Kasekamp. 2000. The Radical Right in Interwar Estonia. London: Palgrave Macmillan,

External links
Webpage about Vaps Movement
"The radical right in interwar Estonia" By Andres Kasekamp

1929 establishments in Estonia
1930s disestablishments in Estonia
Anti-communism in Estonia
Anti-communist organizations
Banned far-right parties
Defunct political parties in Estonia
Estonian nationalism
Political history of Estonia
Veterans' organizations
Political parties established in 1929
Political parties disestablished in 1934
Right-wing populism in Estonia